An exoribonuclease is an exonuclease ribonuclease, which are enzymes that degrade RNA by removing terminal nucleotides from either the 5' end or the 3' end of the RNA molecule. Enzymes that remove nucleotides from the 5' end are called 5'-3' exoribonucleases, and enzymes that remove nucleotides from the 3' end are called 3'-5' exoribonucleases.

Exoribonucleases can use either water to cleave the nucleotide-nucleotide bond (which is called hydrolytic activity) or inorganic phosphate (which is called phosphorolytic activity). Hydrolytic exoribonucleases are classified under EC number 3.1 and phosphorolytic exoribonucleases under EC number 2.7.7. As the phosphorolytic enzymes use inorganic phosphate to cleave bonds they release nucleotide diphosphates, whereas the hydrolytic enzymes (which use water) release nucleotide monosphosphates.

Exoribonucleases exist in all kingdoms of life, the bacteria, archaea, and eukaryotes. Exoribonucleases are involved in the degradation of many different RNA species, including messenger RNA, transfer RNA, ribosomal RNA and miRNA. Exoribonucleases can be single proteins (such as RNase D or RNase PH) but also can be complexes of multiple proteins, such as the exosome complex (in which four of the major exoribonuclease families are represented).

Major families

See also 
 Endoribonuclease
 Nuclease
 Deoxyribonuclease
 Exodeoxyribonuclease
 Endodeoxyribonuclease

References

External links
 

EC 3.1
Ribonucleases